Regensdorf-Watt is a railway station in Switzerland, situated  in the municipality of Regensdorf. The station is located between the towns of Regensdorf and Watt on the Wettingen-Effretikon railway line (Furttal line).

Services 
The station is a stop on the Zurich S-Bahn system. It is served by line S6 and the peak hour-only S21 service, which terminates here. On weekends, there is a nighttime S-Bahn service (SN6) offered by ZVV.

Summary of all S-Bahn services:

 Zürich S-Bahn:
 : half-hourly service to  via .
 Nighttime S-Bahn (only during weekends):

The station is an important hub in the Furttal for regional buses of Verkehrsbetriebe Glattal (VBG).

Gallery

References

External links 
Regensdorf-Watt railway station on SBB-CFF-FFS web site

Railway stations in the canton of Zürich
Swiss Federal Railways stations
Regensdorf